Carlos Daniel Castagneto (born 1 November 1960) is an Argentine politician and former football goalkeeper who played for clubs in Argentina, Chile, Paraguay, Peru and Colombia. From 2015 to 2019 he was a National Deputy representing Buenos Aires Province, as a member of the Kolina party.

Since 2022, he has been head of the Federal Administration of Public Income (AFIP).

Football career
Castagneto made his senior debut with Gimnasia y Esgrima de La Plata in a league match against Club Atlético Temperley on 11 December 1982.

Teams
  Gimnasia y Esgrima de La Plata 1980-1984
  Temperley 1985
  Defensores de Belgrano 1986
  Atlético Bucaramanga 1987
  San Lorenzo 1988
  Quilmes 1989-1991
  Sporting Cristal 1991
  Deportes La Serena 1992
  Guarani 1993

Titles
  Gimnasia y Esgrima de La Plata 1984 (Primera B Nacional Championship)
  Sporting Cristal 1991 (Peruvian Primera División Championship)

Electoral history

References

External links
 

1960 births
Living people
Footballers from La Plata
Argentine footballers
Argentine expatriate footballers
Argentine expatriate sportspeople in Chile
Argentine people of Italian descent
Club de Gimnasia y Esgrima La Plata footballers
San Lorenzo de Almagro footballers
Quilmes Atlético Club footballers
Club Guaraní players
Deportes La Serena footballers
Atlético Bucaramanga footballers
Chilean Primera División players
Argentine Primera División players
Categoría Primera A players
Expatriate footballers in Chile
Expatriate footballers in Peru
Expatriate footballers in Paraguay
Expatriate footballers in Colombia
Members of the Argentine Chamber of Deputies elected in Buenos Aires Province
Association football goalkeepers
Kolina politicians